Meippada Sei is a 2023 Indian Tamil-language drama film directed by Velan and starring Aadhav Balaji and Madhunika Rajalakshmi in the lead roles. It was released on 27 January 2023.

Cast 
 Aadhav Balaji as Pandi
 Madhunika Rajalakshmi as Vanitha
 Jayapalan as Gaja
 P. R. Tamil Selvam
 Raj Kapoor
 O. A. K. Sundar
 Rahul Thatha
 Supergood Subramani
 Vijaya Ganesh
 Bayilwan Ranganathan
 Benjamin

Production 
The film's shoot was completed by 2021 and the first-look poster was released by music composer, D. Imman. The film was initially planned to be released in 2022 but due to the ongoing impact of the pandemic, the film was postponed to 2023. Prior to the film's release, actress Madhunika Rajalakashmi noted that she resonated with the script with the film, revealing that she had also faced abuse during her school days.

Reception 
The film was released on 26 January 2023 across Tamil Nadu. A critic from Dinathanthi wrote "the story moves slowly in the beginning and then picks up pac". A reviewer from Maalai Malar  gave the film 3 out of 5 stars, noting that "the cinematographer has shot the scenes clearly" and that "he has made the song scenes enjoyable and the fight scenes scary"..

References

External links 
 

 2023 films
 2020s Tamil-language films